Iso-Naakkima is a lake in Southern Savonia, Finland, about 10 km south of the town of Pieksämäki. It is notable for having an eroded impact crater under the northwestern part of the lake. It is one of the oldest known, about 1200 million years old (900–1200 Ma, Mesoproterozoic). Of the known craters older than a billion years old, it is also one of the smallest being only 3 km in diameter.

At the time of the impact event, the continent of Baltica (modern northeastern Europe) was located near the equator. The crater is filled by recent (Quaternary) sediments and is not visible to the surface. Its existence was revealed by strikingly circular geophysical anomalies which are concentrated in a region 3 km in diameter; the actual remnant is about 2 km wide and 160 m deep. Its existence was later confirmed by drilling results. The discovery was made in 1989 and therefore Iso-Naakkima is the fourth known impact structure in Finland.

See also
Impact craters in Finland

References

External links
Iso-Naakkima impact structure
Iso Naakkima impact structure — Division of Geophysics, University of Helsinki

Impact craters of Finland
Kymi basin
Proterozoic impact craters
Lakes of Mikkeli
Lakes of Pieksämäki